John Wesley A.M.E. Zion Church is a historic African American church in the Hill District of Pittsburgh, Pennsylvania. The church, which is one of Pittsburgh's oldest African American faith-based organizations, was founded in 1836 following a series of prayer meetings and preaching services.		

On October 11, 1993, the church received City of Pittsburgh Historic Designation as a local landmark. However, in the following year the congregation was forced to temporarily abandon the church property following flooding that was created by waters from an abandoned  mine that ran below the church. In 2006, the church again faced flooding from the mine water, and the Pennsylvania Department of Environmental Protection (DEP) installed new piping to divert the mine water from the church. At the DEP's suggestion, a geothermal system was installed in November 2008 that used the runoff from the mine water to provide heating and cooling for the church building.

References

External links
John Wesley A.M.E. Zion Church / Wesley Charities web site

African-American history in Pittsburgh
African Methodist Episcopal Zion churches
Churches in Pittsburgh
Churches completed in 1894
19th-century Methodist church buildings in the United States